Catherine, il suffit d'un amour was a French television series produced by Antenne 2 in 1986 and based on the Catherine novels written by best-selling French author Juliette Benzoni. The adaptation remained similar to the original text of Juliette Benzoni's story about Catherine and her adventures in France during the 15th century.

The screenplay was written by Benzoni with Jean Chatenet, and directed by Marion Sarraut. Sarraut had previously directed another of Benzoni's best-selling novel series Marianne with Corinne Touzet who starred in the leading role.

Plot summary  
The story takes place in the time of the Armagnac-Burgundian Civil War, a conflict which occurred during a lull in the Hundred Years' War. John the Fearless, Duke of Burgundy, is locked in a struggle against the Armagnacs who support the future King Charles VII.

During the Parisian riots of 1413, Catherine Legoix, the 13-year-old daughter of a goldsmith living on the Pont-au-Change, tries to save a young Armagnac knight, 16-year old Michel de Montsalvy. He is to be executed because he spat at Duke John and called him a traitor. Catherine hides Michel in the family's cellar, but he and her father are murdered by a paternal cousin. Catherine and her mother flee to Dijon to the home of her maternal uncle, Mathieu Gautherin. They are accompanied by Sara the Black, a young gypsy who hid the women in a slum area of Paris.

Catherine's attempt to save Michel de Montsalvy has changed her life. At the age of twenty-one, she is a beautiful woman. At this point, she meets a wounded knight, the noble Arnaud de Montsalvy who is one of Joan of Arc's captains and the late Michel de Montsalvy's younger brother.

After Catherine and Arnaud fall in love, Arnaud discovers that one of Catherine's family members killed his older brother. He wishes to avenge his brother's death by killing Catherine, but tells her he will not do so because she is a woman. Her beauty attracts the attention of Duke Philip the Good who desires her. He orders his treasurer, Garin de Brazey, to marry Catherine so she can be received at court despite her low birth.

Because Catherine believes Arnaud is to marry Isabelle de Sévérac, she agrees to be the mistress of the powerful Duke who showers her with titles and riches. At the Duke's courts in Dijon and Bruges, Catherine meets important historical figures such as Flemish painter Jan van Eyck, Jean Lefèvre de Saint-Rémy, Gilles de Rais, Jacques Cœur, and Yolande d'Aragon.

After Catherine's four-year-old son Philippe de Brazey dies, she discovers Arnaud de Montsalvy never married. Because is still in love with him, she travels to the beleaguered city of Orléans where Arnaud and the other captains of Joan of Arc are fighting against the English. In Orléans, Catherine's life is saved by Joan of Arc after Catherine has been condemned to death for treason.

After enduring many dangerous adventures, Catherine finds happiness. She becomes the beloved wife of Arnaud de Montsalvy, Lord of the Châtaignerie in Auvergne and Captain in the service of King Charles VII.

Cast

Main characters

 Claudine Ancelot : Catherine Legoix / Catherine de Montsalvy
 Pierre-Marie Escourrou : Michel de Montsalvy / Arnaud de Montsalvy
 Pascale Petit : Black Sara
 Nicole Maurey : Isabelle de Montsalvy
 Anne Lefébure : Jacquette Legoix
 Henri Guybet : Gaucher Legoix
 Christian Alers : Mathieu Gautherin
 Philippe Clay : Barnaby of the Cockleshell
 Jean-François Poron : Duke Philip of Burgundy
 Stéphane Bouy : Garin de Brazey / Spanish monk
 Dora Doll : Ermengarde de Châteauvillain
 Jacques Duby : Brother Étienne
 Amidou : Abou-al-Khayr
 Geneviève Casile : Queen Yolande of Aragon
 Gérard Chambre : Jean Poton de Xaintrailles
 Philippe Murgier : Jacques Cœur

Supporting characters

 Isabelle Guiard : Joan of Arc
 Pierre Deny : Jean de Dunois
 Benoît Brione : Gilles de Rais
 Georges Montillier : Bishop Cauchon
 Marthe Mercadier : Mathilde Boucher
 Jacques Brucher : Jacques de Roussay
 Daniel Tarrare : Jean de Luxembourg
 François Brincourt : Arthur III, Duke of Brittany
 Stéphane Fey : Tristan l'Hermite
 Michel Duplaix : Raoul de Gaucourt
 Christian Rauth : Fero, Gypsy Lord
 Philippe Caroit : Pierre de Brézé
 Michel Peyleron : Georges de la Trémoille
 Lena Grinda : Catherine de la Trémoille
 Marie Daëms : Anne de Sillé
 Sylvain Lemarié : Abbot Bernard
 Rebecca Potok : Gauberte Cairou
 Philippe Nahon : Fortunat
 Hervé Pauchon : Gauthier de Chazay 
 Hugues Profy : Bérenger de Roquemaurel
 Virginie Pradal : Margot
 Anne-Marie Scieller : Marie de Comborn
 Bernard Ortega : Rodrigo de Villandrando
 James Sparrow : Sir Hugh Kennedy of Ardstinchar
 Patrice Alexsandre : Robert Ier de Sarrebruck-Commercy
 Jean-Claude Aubé : King René d'Anjou
 Julie Odekerken Sarraut : Agnès Sorel
 Bénédicte Sire : Azalaïs the lacemaker
 Corinne Touzet : Princess Zobeïda
 Marc Samuel : Josse Rallard
 Clément Michu : Maître Gaspard Cornelis
 Philippe Auriault : Landry Pigasse
 Serge Marquard : Simon Caboche
 Sylvie Folgoas : Michelle de France

Production
The television series was a co-production involving Antenne 2 (succeeded by France 2) and SFP. The producer of the series was Henri Spade.  After following the success of the Marianne series – which aired on 21 November 1983 – Spade supported the new project Catherine, il suffit d'un amour.

Conception and development
In the press review in 1983 for Marianne, une étoile pour Napoléon, Benzoni writes: "Thanks go to Marion Sarraut, director after my heart... provided with a heart, sensibility and talent, a great artistic sense and an astonishingly safe flair to choose interpreters".

In the weekly television listings magazine Télé Star said: "I do not want a director other than Marion". Marion Sarraut and Juliette Benzoni had a great admiration both for each other as well as Jean Chatenet, wrote the screenplay. Filming began in 1985 of Catherine, il suffit d'un amour after only two years of preparation by director Marion Sarraut. The production had a total of 200 actors, 1,500 costumes, 45 technicians, and 130 horses.

The horses were trained by Mario Luraschi, horse trainer and stuntman both for French and international cinema.

Casting
For the male leading role, Marion Sarraut said that Pierre-Marie Escourrou did not correspond at first to the idea of the personality she had in mind – however after his audition she knew that she had found the perfect Arnaud de Montsalvy.  The yet unknown young actress Claudine Ancelot was the perfect Catherine de Montsalvy.

As a special bonus, popular French actors and actresses were engaged to play cameo roles in Catherine. The cast was joined by Geneviève Casile of the Comédie-Française, Jean-François Poron, Philippe Clay, Pascale Petit and Dora Doll.

Filming
The shooting of the television series lasted for 15 months. The indoor scenes were shot at the Buttes-Chaumont SFP studios in Paris, and the outdoor scenes were filmed on location in Burgundy, Chaumont, Blois, Auvergne, Château de Sully-sur-Loire, Villefranche-de-Conflent, and Le prieuré de Marcevol. The oldest quarters of the city at Castelnou in the Pyrenees served as Montsalvy, the home of Catherine and Arnaud. Scenes set at the Alhambra in Granada were shot at the castle of the Kings of Majorca in Perpignan.

Music
The music was composed by Robert Viger who had already composed several soundtracks such as Les Amours romantiques for a French television series. In 1983, Viger had composed the television soundtrack for the successful Marianne. Juliette Benzoni's Marianne, une étoile pour Napoléon (six books) was the first of the novel series filmed for French television.

Critical reception
On 19 March 1986, Catherine, il suffit d'un amour was proclaimed "the largest soap opera ever created in France". It was broadcast at 13:30 CET each afternoon during the week. Several critics praised the lavish scale of the production, comparing it to popular American television soaps such as Dynasty and Dallas.

The daily newspaper Le Monde wrote: "Un soap opera? Certes! Mais realise avec panache. Il est patent que les acteurs s’y sont vraiment eclates. Et c’est contagieux... pourquoi pas?" (English translation: A soap opera? Certainly! But with panache. It is clear that the actors really go for broke. And it's contagious… why not?)

In Poland, the 1986 television series was shown on TVP1 from 2 April to 9 July 1989.  It was  known as the Polish title Katarzyna, and it contained a total of 15 episodes which ran  approximately 90 minutes each.

Home media
In December 2007, the French book sales club France Loisirs released the entire series on DVD with the complete collection consisting of five boxes in ten discs. The covers of the DVD boxes displayed images from the 1986 television series, but there were no English subtitles, special features, nor extra elements included.

Eventually, the DVD version of the television series – originally consisting of 60 episodes and 26 minutes – were reduced to 30 episodes of 52 minutes each.

See also
 Cultural depictions of Joan of Arc
 France in the Middle Ages
 Middle Ages in popular culture
 1986 in French television

References

External links
 Website dedicated to the television series Catherine, il suffit d'un amour en/fr   
 Website dedicated to film location Catherine 
 

French drama television series
Television series set in the 15th century
Television shows based on French novels
1980s French television series
1986 in French television
Cultural depictions of Joan of Arc
Cultural depictions of Gilles de Rais